Lusk is an unincorporated community in Scott County, in the U.S. state of Missouri.

History
Lusk once had a schoolhouse and a chapel, now defunct.  The schoolhouse and chapel were named after William M. Lusk, a local preacher.

References

Unincorporated communities in Scott County, Missouri
Unincorporated communities in Missouri